Kalpana Debnath is an Indian Bengali gymnast from Tripura who received the Arjuna Award in 2000 for her contributions to Indian gymnastics. She is the second Arjuna awardee from Tripura after Mantu Debnath. She was trained by Dalip Singh.

See also 

 Gymnastics in India
 List of Arjuna award recipients (2000–2009)
 Arjuna Award
 Tripura

References 

Indian female artistic gymnasts
Sportswomen from Tripura
People from Tripura
Living people
Year of birth missing (living people)
Recipients of the Arjuna Award